Hoseynabad (also Romanized as Ḩoseynābād) is a village in Koleyn Rural District, Fashapuyeh District, Ray County, Tehran Province, Iran. At the 2006 census, its population was 41, in 11 families.

References 

Populated places in Ray County, Iran